Inga is a genus of tropical trees and shrubs.

Inga or Ingá may also refer to:

Geography 
 Ingá, district of Niterói, Rio de Janeiro state, Brazil
 Ingá, Paraíba, city in Paraíba state, Brazil
 Ingá Stone
 Ingå, municipality of Finland
 Inga Lake, a Canadian lake along the Alaska Highway
 Inga Falls, a waterfall on the Congo River
 Inga dams, dams and hydroelectric power generators on the Congo river

Other uses 
 Inga (novel), a 2014 novel by Poile Sengupta
 Inga people, a group of indigenous peoples in Colombia
 Inga Kichwa, their language
 Inga (film), a 1968 film by Joseph W. Sarno
 Inka (dharma) or Inga, Zen Buddhist concept
 Inga, a character in the 1974 comedy film Young Frankenstein
 Inga (moth), a genus of moths in the family Oecophoridae
 "Inga", an episode of M*A*S*H
 Prince Inga of Pingaree, a character in Rinkitink in Oz
 Hurricane Inga, a 1969 Atlantic hurricane
 Winter Storm Inga

People
 Inga (given name)
 Inga of Varteig (c. 1185–1234), mistress of King Haakon III of Norway and the mother of King Haakon IV
 Va'aiga Tuigamala (1969-2022), nicknamed Inga The Winger, Samoan rugby union and rugby league player, New Zealand rugby union player

See also
 Ingvar (name)
 Ingo
 Inha Babakova